"I Still Love You" is a song by the Bee Gees primarily written by Barry, Robin & Maurice Gibb. It was released as a double A side of "Living Eyes" and on the album Living Eyes. Produced by the Gibb brothers with Albhy Galuten and Karl Richardson.

The song included in the compilations, Bee Gees (1999) Bee Gees Mix and Love Hits (1987).

Background
"I Still Love You" is a song written by Barry, Robin and Maurice Gibb in 1981. Robin Gibb sings lead on this track, he also sings harmony with Maurice doing upper and lower register harmonies on the chorus and the second verse. The song ends with a high fret tone. Chuck Kirkpatrick plays sitar and rhodes organ while Ralph McDonald plays percussion. On its intro it features the orchestra backing and Chuck Kirkpatrick's Rhodes organ.

Music critic Joe Viglione at Allmusic described this song as Robin Gibb in Bee Gees form with lush arrangements and production.

Personnel
 Robin Gibb — lead and harmony vocals
 Barry Gibb — guitar, harmony vocals 
 Maurice Gibb — guitar, secondary vocals
 Richard Tee — piano
 Chuck Kirkpatrick — Rhodes organ, sitar
 Harold Cowart — bass
 Steve Gadd — drums
 Ralph McDonald — percussion

References

1981 songs
1981 singles
Bee Gees songs
Songs written by Barry Gibb
Songs written by Robin Gibb
Songs written by Maurice Gibb
Song recordings produced by Barry Gibb
Song recordings produced by Robin Gibb
Song recordings produced by Maurice Gibb
RSO Records singles
Song recordings produced by Albhy Galuten